Christian Murro (born 19 May 1978, in Saronno) is an Italian road bicycle racer.

Palmares

2004
 1st, Gran Premio Industria e Commercio Artigianato Carnaghese
2006
 1st, Ruddervoorde
2007
 1st, Tre Valli Varesine

External links 

Italian male cyclists
1978 births
Living people
Cyclists from the Province of Varese
21st-century Italian people